Ellen Pitfield (1857 – August 1912) was an English midwife, nurse, devoted suffragette and member of Emmeline Pankhurst's Women's Social and Political Union. The movement focused on gaining the women’s right to vote with the motto “Deeds Not Words.” This expresses the importance of action and change within the United Kingdom.  

Ellen Pitfield reportedly joined this movement in the year of 1908, immediately becoming aware and willing to learn about proper intakes of this Union. 

Throughout the next year of 1909, many militants asked for responsible men to attend public business that led to horrible “costly work. Any women who spoke up about this or dared mention the matter were beaten and sent to prison.

As Pitfield started to become a more determined WSPU suffragette, she became more involved with the women’s suffrage campaign for militant activity; this caused her to get arrested twice throughout that same year. Being in prison meant having to create calculated plans to escape. The women there, including Ellen Pitfield, would purposefully starve themselves so the police would have no choice but to let them go.  After being released in 1909, she is reported to have said: "There are only two things that matter to me in the world: principle and liberty. For these I will fight as long as there is life in my veins. I am no longer an individual, I am an instrument."

As a nurse, Pitfield was able to care for injuries that took place within these times.

During this Hunger Strike, Pitfield had been given a Hunger Strike Medal 'for Valour' by WSPU.

In 1911, Ellen was asked to take the census survey given out that year but quickly refused to do so. Around the same time, Ellen discovered she had cancer and would not be able to recover. Her commitment to the suffragette cause is really captured by what she did next despite her diagnosis. 

In March 1912, Ellen wrote to WSPU leader Emmeline Pankhurst declaring herself 'A Soldier to the death'. She then continued to enter the General Post office and set it on fire with paraffin. She had thrown a brick through a window of the building as a form of riot and protest and gave herself up to police to raise publicity for the cause. She was quickly sentenced for six months of imprisonment and then carried out to the prison hospital due to her condition.That month, she was sentenced to six months imprisonment and was carried from court to the prison hospital. 

According to Pankhurst, she was released in May, after the Men's Political Union for Women's Enfranchisement started a petition on her behalf, and was cared for at Pembroke Garden nursing home by Nurses Catherine Pine and Gertrude Townend, and died three months later, in August 1912.

References

Footnotes

Works cited

1912 deaths
19th-century English people
20th-century English people
British feminists
British women's rights activists
English women in politics
Feminism and history
Women of the Victorian era
Women's Social and Political Union
Hunger Strike Medal recipients